George Gothard Aitken (2 July 1898 – 8 July 1952) was a rugby union footballer who represented New Zealand – known as the All Blacks – and then Scotland. He was born in Westport, New Zealand, and was selected to play provincially for Buller at the age of 16. After moving to Wellington, Aitken played for the province from 1917, and from there was selected for the All Blacks side that faced South Africa when they toured New Zealand in 1921. After only two Test matches for the All Blacks, both as captain, he was dropped from the team. In 1922 Aitken was awarded a Rhodes Scholarship and travelled to England to study at the University of Oxford. He played for the university's rugby club, and from there he was selected for Scotland. He first represented the country in 1924, and in 1925 appeared in all of their Five Nations matches; Scotland won all four of those games, and in doing so achieved their first ever Grand Slam.

Early life and rugby career 
Aitken was born in Westport in 1898, and was educated at Westport District High School. He played rugby at centre, and was selected for Buller as a 16-year-old – playing for them in 1914 and 1915. He moved to Wellington to attend Victoria University College (now Victoria University) where he played for the Victoria University club. In 1917 he was selected for the Wellington – that season representatives were restricted to players under military age due to the First World War. He continued to represent the province in the following seasons, and in 1919 Wellington resumed Ranfurly Shield matches; Wellington had won the Shield off Taranaki in 1914, but had not defended it at all due to the War. Aitken played in twelve Ranfurly Shield defences during his career.

Aitken continued to play for Wellington in 1920 – the province had a very strong team – when the side included a number of All Blacks. He was selected for New Zealand Universities when they faced the touring Sydney University team; Aitken played in both matches between the sides; the first was won 17–6 by New Zealand, and the second won 11–8 by Sydney University.

All Blacks 

The 1921 season was Aitken's most significant while in New Zealand. He was selected for the North Island side in the annual Inter-Island match, which was won by the North 28–13. For the second season he was selected for the New Zealand University team that played both Wellington and New South Wales. South Africa were touring New Zealand for the first time that year, and their itinerary included a three-Test series against the All Blacks. Aitken was selected at centre for the first Test match, and was surprisingly selected as captain, despite not having played for his country before, and never leading his province. He was described by rugby writer Winston McCarthy as "a beautiful mover of the ball who had the number one attribute of a good centre, to run his wings into position". The Test was at Carisbrook, Dunedin, in front of 25,000 spectators, and the game started well for the South Africans, who scored the first try, and led 5–0 at half-time. The New Zealanders responded with three tries in the second half to win 13–5.

The second Test was in Auckland; the All Black selectors made only three changes, and Aitken was again selected as captain and at centre. A crowd of 40,000 watched the two sides contest a close game; the scores were tied 5–5 until a late drop-goal from Springbok Gerhard Morkel (worth four points at the time), gave the South Africans a 9–5 victory. Aitken's form in the match was poor, however he had been ill with the flu leading up to the game. Consequently, for the third and deciding Test Aitken was dropped, and replaced as captain by Teddy Roberts, and at centre by Mark Nicholls. Aitken's dropping as a captain and a player was viewed as harsh, and he never played for New Zealand again, thereby becoming one of the few players to captain the All Blacks in every match they played.

Scotland 
The following year Aitken was awarded a Rhodes Scholarship to study at Oxford University in England. His last match in New Zealand was played on 9 August 1922. The match was a mid-week Ranfurly Shield challenge between Hawke's Bay and the holders Wellington. Aitken was in the strong Wellington side, who were expected to easily defeat the challengers. However Hawke's Bay upset Aitken's side 19–9, and went on to hold the Ranfurly Shield for five years.

After moving to England, Aitken played for Oxford Rugby Football Club, and was awarded a Blue for the University. He played one game for Leicester Tigers in 1923. He was eventually selected for Scotland, and played eight Tests for them between 1924 and 1929. The Scottish side included an all-Oxford University three-quarters; the other three were George MacPherson, Ian Smith, and Johnnie Wallace. In 1925 Scotland won their first ever Five Nations (now Six Nations) Grand Slam – victory over all four of their Five Nations opponents.

After graduating from Oxford, Aitken went into business in England. He later returned in New Zealand in 1939, where he worked for Department of Industries and Commerce. He died on 8 July 1952 in Wellington.

Notes

References

Sources

Books

Articles and web 

 
 
 
 

1898 births
1952 deaths
Alumni of St John's College, Oxford
Barbarian F.C. players
Buller rugby union players
Expatriate rugby union players in Scotland
Leicester Tigers players
New Zealand expatriate sportspeople in Scotland
New Zealand international rugby union players
New Zealand Rhodes Scholars
Oxford University RFC players
People educated at Buller High School
Rugby union centres
Rugby union players from Westport, New Zealand
Scotland international rugby union players
Wellington rugby union players